Gura Balial is a village in the Kotli District of Azad Kashmir, Pakistan. It is located at 33°19'40N 74°4'0E with an altitude of 820 metres (2693 feet). Neighbouring settlements include Bindian and Saidpur.

References

Populated places in Kotli District